Morden station may mean one of the following stations in Morden, in south-west London:

Current stations:
Morden tube station - a London Underground station
Morden South railway station, on the Thameslink line

Closed or unbuilt stations
Morden Road railway station - a closed station built by the Wimbledon and Croydon Railway, originally named "Morden" and then "Morden Halt"
Morden tube station (District Railway), also known as "South Morden", an unbuilt station planned by the Wimbledon and Sutton Railway